Francis Willis (January 5, 1745 – January 25, 1829) was a United States representative from the state of Georgia.

Biography
Willis was born in Frederick County in the Virginia Colony. He served as captain and colonel in the Revolutionary War in 1777 and 1778 in Grayson's Regiment under Colonel William Grayson.

He moved to Wilkes County, Georgia in 1784 and was elected to the United States House of Representatives as an at-large representative from Georgia. He served one term during the 2nd United States Congress from March 4, 1791, until March 3, 1793.

After his congressional service, Willis moved to Maury County, Tennessee, and died there in 1829.

References
 Retrieved on 2009-5-19

Thomas, John  "A Man of Scotch-Irish Descent in Virginia: An Odyssey into the World of Francis Willis"  1994

1745 births
1829 deaths
Continental Army officers from Virginia
Members of the United States House of Representatives from Georgia (U.S. state)
People from Frederick County, Virginia
People from Wilkes County, Georgia
People from Maury County, Tennessee